Marian Putyra (born 19 September 1957) is a retired Polish football manager.

References

1957 births
Living people
Polish football managers
Zagłębie Lubin managers
Śląsk Wrocław managers
People from Lubin